This list of ancient Roman collegia (Latin singular collegium, meaning "joined together"; English for "college") denotes a subset of professional, religious, and burial associations that existed during the Roman Republic and Roman Empire.  The other major legal form of Roman associations were political clubs, known as sodalitates.  The collegia played a critical sociological role in organizing Roman society, particularly among slaves and the other lower classes.  Concurrently, much of the history of collegia were left unrecorded by Roman historians, as the aristocratic authors of the time were predominantly uninterested in chronicling the labor union activities, cult worshiping rituals, and general social practices of the working classes. Exceptions to this rule existed, such as the notable and prestigious Collegium Pistorum, the college of bakers, which received wealth, political status in the Roman Senate, and some historical attention in ancient Rome.  The most powerful of these professional collegia often had considerable political influence, including over legislation and magistrate appointments.  This professional class of collegia were modeled in the same manner as a public corporation.  However, under Roman law, collegia never were granted the same legal rights of personhood as modern corporations.

The main demarcation in the study of ancient Roman collegia concerns their legal statuses with the Roman authorities.  A collegium was either classified as being collegium legitimum or collegium illicitum, respective as to whether the collegium was lawful or unlawful.  This classification went through several paradigms throughout the course of Roman history, with various Senates and Emperors being either strict or lax with the legal requirements of a collegium.  In many of these stricter periods, enforcement of collegial law remained lax and the majority of collegia in operation were done so unlawfully.  The most famous of these unlawful collegia was Christianity.  Furthermore, local governors and other magistrates often had liberal discretion over banning or sanctioning collegia within their jurisdictions.  For these reasons, the same collegium would occasionally be disbanded and reconstituted, depending on the policies of the Roman authorities.  For example, the Collegium Bacchus was the first recorded collegium to be outlawed.  In 186 BC, the worship of Bacchus was banned by Senate decree.  Subsequently, restored, the Collegium Bacchus was banned, for a brief period, a second time by the Roman Republic, in 64 BC.

Magistrate attitudes towards collegia were notably distinct between the central government in Italia and the Eastern Roman Empire.   In 21 BC, under the reign of Emperor Augustus, the Roman Senate passed the Iulia lex collegiis.  The effect of Iulia lex collegiis granted collegia with a certain legal capacity, including property rights and legal standing in judicial proceedings as both a defendant and plaintiff.  Throughout the imperial era, the collegia also acquired the ability to receive inheritances.

Collegia

Keys

See also

Associations in Ancient Rome
Collegium (ancient Rome)
Digest (Roman law)
Lex Julia
Twelve Tables

References

Bibliography and further reading

Organizations based in ancient Rome